William John Froats (October 20, 1930 – February 9, 1998) was a Major League Baseball pitcher. He appeared in one game for Detroit in 1955.

The 24-year-old rookie took the mound on April 22, 1955 at Cleveland Stadium in the bottom of the 7th inning with the Tigers trailing the Cleveland Indians.  He pitched two scoreless innings for Detroit, giving up two walks and no hits.  The final score was Indians 8, Tigers 5.  Froats was credited with a game finished, and his lifetime earned run average stands at 0.00.

He was drafted by the New York Giants from the Tigers on December 3, 1956. He never again appeared in a major league contest but had a successful career with the Buffalo Bisons of the AAA International League.

William John Froats was the son of surgeon Esley Robert Froats (1903–1954) and his wife Marguerite McCarney. He served in the US Army from 1952 to 1954. He died at the age of 67 in Minneapolis, Minnesota and was buried at the Gate of Heaven Cemetery outside of New York City.

References

External links
Baseball Reference
Retrosheet

Major League Baseball pitchers
Baseball players from New York (state)
Notre Dame Fighting Irish baseball players
Detroit Tigers players
Burials at Gate of Heaven Cemetery (Hawthorne, New York)
1930 births
1998 deaths
Cardinal Hayes High School alumni
Augusta Tigers players
Buffalo Bisons (minor league) players
Corpus Christi Giants players
Durham Bulls players
Louisville Colonels (minor league) players
Williamsport Tigers players